Jacqueline O. Shogan (born June 5, 1953 in Flushing, Queens, New York City, New York) is a judge at the Superior Court of Pennsylvania. She was first elected in 2007 and then re-elected in 2017.

Education and legal career 
Jacqueline attended University of Virginia where she graduated in 1981 with master's degree in nursing. After some years she decided to attend a law school where she attended Duke University School of Law in Durham, North Carolina and enrolled for a JD program, she graduated in 1990. Shogan began her career as a law clerk at the United States District Court for The Western District of Pennsylvania between 1997 and 2001. In 2002, she began working at Thorp Reed & Armstrong LLP, a consulting firm in Pennsylvania as an attorney.

In 2008, Shogan was appointed Judge of the Monroeville Pennsylvania Superior Court. After the end of her ten year term, Judge Shogan filed to stand for retention by voters in 2017. She was retained and her current term ends in 2028.

References 

1953 births
Living people
People from Flushing, Queens
Justices of the Supreme Court of Pennsylvania
Judges of the Superior Court of Pennsylvania
Pennsylvania lawyers
Lawyers from New York City